Iridescent Interpenetration is the title of several artworks and studies in a series by Italian Futurist painter Giacomo Balla, created between 1912 and 1914, which feature intersecting triangles and other geometric patterns in kaleidoscopic color.

In Iridescent Interpenetration, Balla attempts to separate the experience of light from the perception of objects as such, in an approach he had experimented with in Welcome to Düsseldorf. The works suggest an extension of the pictured surface beyond the borders of the frame.

The earliest known study in the series was on a postcard which Balla mailed to his friend and student Gino Galli on November 21, 1912.

Works in the series include:

See also
List of works by Giacomo Balla

References

Works by Giacomo Balla
Futurist paintings
1910s paintings